Badradine Belloumou (born March 15, 1984 in Martigues, France) is a French-Algerian football player who is currently playing as a defender for US Marignane in the Championnat de France amateur. He has previously played for FC Martigues, CS Sedan, US Roye and SO Cassis Carnoux. He also had a spell in Algeria with ASO Chlef.

Club career
 2002-2003 FC Martigues 
 2003-2004 CS Sedan 
 2004-2005 US Roye 
 2005-2008 FC Martigues 
 2008-2009 SO Cassis Carnoux 
 2009 ASO Chlef 
 2009–2012 FC Martigues 
 2012– US Marignane

References

1984 births
Living people
Algerian footballers
French footballers
CS Sedan Ardennes players
FC Martigues players
SO Cassis Carnoux players
ASO Chlef players
French sportspeople of Algerian descent
Marignane Gignac Côte Bleue FC players
Association football defenders